List of National League Slugging Percentage Leaders

The National League slugging percentage Leader is the Major League Baseball player in the National League who has the highest slugging percentage in a particular season.

In baseball statistics, slugging percentage' (abbreviated SLG) is a measure of the power of a hitter. It is calculated as total bases divided by at bats:

where AB is the number of at-bats for a given player, and 1B, 2B, 3B, and HR are the number of singles, doubles, triples, and home runs, respectively. Walks are specifically excluded from this calculation.

Currently, a player needs to accrue an average of at least 3.1 plate appearances for each game his team plays in order to qualify for the title.  An exception to this qualification rule is that if a player falls short of 3.1 plate appearances per game, but would still have the highest batting average if enough hitless at-bats were added to reach the 3.1 average mark, the player still wins the slugging percentage championship.

The latest example of this exception being employed was in 2007, when Ryan Braun had a .634 slugging percentage, but only 492 plate appearances – 10 short of the 502 necessary.  The addition of 10 hitless at-bats would have lowered his slugging percentage to a value that was still better than anyone else in the league, so Braun was the National League slugging percentage champion.  A similar situation occurred when Tony Gwynn won the NL batting title in 1996.

Year-by-Year National League Slugging Percentage Leaders

2021    Bryce Harper (PHI) .615
2020   Juan Soto (WSN) .695
2019   Christian Yelich (MIL) .671
2018   Christian Yelich (MIL) .598
2017   Giancarlo Stanton (MIA) .631
2016   Daniel Murphy (WSN) .595
2015   Bryce Harper (WSN) .649
2014   Giancarlo Stanton (MIA) .555
2013   Paul Goldschmidt (ARI) .551
2012   Giancarlo Stanton (MIA) **.608
2011   Ryan Braun (MIL) .597
2010   Joey Votto (CIN) .600
2009   Albert Pujols (STL) .658		
2008   Albert Pujols (STL) .653
2007	Ryan Braun (MIL) **.634
2006	Albert Pujols (STL) .671
2005	Derrek Lee (CHC) .662
2004	Barry Bonds (SFG) .812
2003	Barry Bonds (SFG) .749
2002	Barry Bonds (SFG) .799
2001	Barry Bonds (SFG) .863
2000	Todd Helton (COL) .698
1999	Larry Walker (COL) .710
1998	Mark McGwire (STL) .752
1997	Larry Walker (COL) .720
1996 	Ellis Burks (COL) .639
1995	Dante Bichette (COL) .620
1994	Jeff Bagwell (HOU) .750
1993	Barry Bonds (SFG) .677
1992	Barry Bonds (PIT) .624
1991	Will Clark (SFG) .536
1990	Barry Bonds (PIT) .565
1989	Kevin Mitchell (SFG) .635
1988	Darryl Strawberry (NYM) .545
1987	Jack Clark (STL) .597
1986	Mike Schmidt+ (PHI) .547
1985	Pedro Guerrero (LAD) .577
1984	Dale Murphy (ATL) .547
1983	Dale Murphy (ATL) .540
1982	Mike Schmidt+ (PHI) .547
1981	Mike Schmidt+ (PHI) .644
1980	Mike Schmidt+ (PHI) .624
1979   Dave Kingman (CHC) .613
1978   Dave Parker (PIT) .585
1977   George Foster (CIN) .631
1976   Joe Morgan+ (CIN) .576
1975   Dave Parker (PIT) .541
1974   Mike Schmidt+ (PHI) .546
1973   Willie Stargell+ (PIT) .646
1972   Billy Williams+ (CHC) .606
1971   Hank Aaron+ (ATL) .669
1970   Willie McCovey+ (SFG) .612
1969   Willie McCovey+ (SFG) .656
1968   Willie McCovey+ (SFG) .545
1967   Hank Aaron+ (ATL) .573
1966   Dick Allen (PHI) .632
1965   Willie Mays+ (SFG) .645
1964   Willie Mays+ (SFG) .607
1963   Hank Aaron+ (MLN) .586
1962   Frank Robinson+ (CIN) .624
1961   Frank Robinson+ (CIN) .611
1960   Frank Robinson+ (CIN) .595
1959   Hank Aaron+ (MLN) .636
1958   Ernie Banks+ (CHC) .614
1957   Willie Mays+ (NYG) .626
1956   Duke Snider+ (BRO) .598
1955   Willie Mays+ (NYG) .659
1954   Willie Mays+ (NYG) .667
1953   Duke Snider+ (BRO) .627
1952   Stan Musial+ (STL) .538
1951   Ralph Kiner+ (PIT) .627
1950   Stan Musial+ (STL) .596
1949   Ralph Kiner+ (PIT) .658
1948   Stan Musial+ (STL) .702
1947   Ralph Kiner+ (PIT) .639
1946   Stan Musial+ (STL) .587
1945   Tommy Holmes (BSN) .577
1944   Stan Musial+ (STL) .549
1943   Stan Musial+ (STL) .562
1942   Johnny Mize+ (NYG) .521
1941   Pete Reiser (BRO) .558
1940   Johnny Mize+ (STL) .636
1939   Johnny Mize+ (STL) .626
1938   Johnny Mize+ (STL) .614
1937   Joe Medwick+ (STL) .641
1936   Mel Ott+ (NYG) .588
1935   Arky Vaughan+ (PIT).607
1934   Ripper Collins (STL) .615
1933   Chuck Klein+ (PHI) .602
1932   Chuck Klein+ (PHI) .646
1931   Chuck Klein+ (PHI) .584
1930   Hack Wilson+ (CHC) .723
1929   Rogers Hornsby+ (CHC) .679
1928   Rogers Hornsby+ (BSN) .632
1927   Chick Hafey+ (STL) .590
1926   Cy Williams (PHI) .568
1925   Rogers Hornsby+ (STL) .756
1924   Rogers Hornsby+ (STL) .696
1923   Rogers Hornsby+ (STL) .627
1922   Rogers Hornsby+ (STL) .722
1921   Rogers Hornsby+ (STL) .639
1920   Rogers Hornsby+ (STL) .559
1919   Hy Myers (BRO) .436
1918   Edd Roush+ (CIN) .455
1917   Rogers Hornsby+ (STL) .484
1916   Zack Wheat+ (BRO) .461
1915   Gavvy Cravath (PHI) .510
1914   Sherry Magee (PHI) .509
1913   Gavvy Cravath (PHI) .568
1912   Heinie Zimmerman (CHC) .571
1911   Frank Schulte (CHC) .534
1910   Sherry Magee (PHI) .507
1909   Honus Wagner+ (PIT) .489
1908   Honus Wagner+ (PIT) .542
1907   Honus Wagner+ (PIT) .513
1906   Harry Lumley (BRO) .477
1905   Cy Seymour (CIN) .559
1904   Honus Wagner+ (PIT) .520
1903   Fred Clarke+ (PIT) .532
1902   Honus Wagner+ (PIT) .463
1901   Jimmy Sheckard (BRO) .534

+ Hall of Famer

A ** by the stat's value indicates the player had fewer than the required number of plate appearances for the SLG title that year. In order to rank the player, the necessary number of hitless at bats were added to the player's season total.  The value here is their actual value, and not the value used to rank them.

References

Slu
Slugging percentage title